Rahan may refer to:

Places 
 Rahan, County Offaly, a parish and village in Ireland
 Rahan Castle, a ruined castle near Dunkineely, County Donegal, Ireland

Other uses 
 Rahan (comics), a French comics series about an intelligent prehistoric man, first published in 1969

See also 
 Do Rahan, Isfahan, a village in Padena-ye Olya Rural District, Isfahan Province, Iran
 Miyan Rahan City, the capital of Dinavar District, Kermanshah Province, Iran
 Ngyaung-u-Tsau Rahan (AKA Saw Rahan II,  – 1001), King of Burma
 Sar Takht-e Do Rahan, a village in Khuzestan Province, Iran